Nucleolar protein with MIF4G domain 1 is a protein that in humans is encoded by the NOM1 gene.

Proteins that contain MIF4G (middle of eIF4G (MIM 600495)) and/or MA3 domains, such as NOM1, function in protein translation. These domains include binding sites for members of the EIF4A family of ATP-dependent DEAD box RNA helicases (see EIF4A1; MIM 602641) (Simmons et al., 2005 ).[supplied by OMIM].

Model organisms

Model organisms have been used in the study of NOM1 function. A conditional knockout mouse line, called Nom1tm1a(KOMP)Wtsi was generated as part of the International Knockout Mouse Consortium program — a high-throughput mutagenesis project to generate and distribute animal models of disease to interested scientists.

Male and female animals underwent a standardized phenotypic screen to determine the effects of deletion. Twenty five tests were carried out on mutant mice and three significant abnormalities were observed. No homozygous mutant embryos were identified during gestation, and therefore none survived until weaning. The remaining tests were carried out on heterozygous mutant adult mice and females had an abnormal hair cycle.

References

Further reading 
 

Genes mutated in mice